General elections were held in Turkey on 10 October 1965. The result was a victory for the Justice Party, which won 240 of the 450 seats. Voter turnout was 71.3%.

Electoral system
The national remnant electoral system was used. This was a two-tier system of party-list proportional representation, with the country divided into 66 districts. In each district, parties were awarded one seat for each Hare quota. Remaining votes and seats were pooled on the national level, where the remaining seats were distributed amongst the parties using the remaining votes using the Hare quota and largest remainder method.

Results

References

General elections in Turkey
Turkey
Turkey
General